War Live is the first live album by American band War, recorded during a four-night engagement at Chicago's High Chapparral club and released as a double LP on United Artists Records in 1973.  The album was reissued on Rhino Records as a double disc CD on 1992 September 15  and again on 2008 March 31.

The album contains a mere seven songs, including "Ballero" which was previously unreleased.  Many of the songs appear in extended versions, two of them filling an LP side apiece.  One single was taken from the album: "Ballero" / "Slippin' into Darkness" (both heavily edited for single release), which charted at #33 on the USA pop chart, and #17 on the R&B singles charts..  The album sold 1.5 million copies.

Cover art
The front cover shows a grid of 24 concert photos.  A further 24 photos appear on the back, and 48 more on the inner gatefold.  Early copies had no artist name or title on the cover (aside from the spine); this information appeared on a large yellow sticker attached to the shrink wrap.  The sticker lists six of seven track titles.  On later copies, the cover was modified to include an image of the sticker, now printed on the cover and covering part of the photo spread.  Note that the exclamation mark after the title only appears on the sticker and later front covers; it does not appear on the spine or labels, and should not be considered as part of the title.  On the CD reissue, the original front cover panel has been replaced by one of the innersleeve panels.

Track listing
All tracks composed by War (Papa Dee Allen, Harold Brown, B.B. Dickerson, Lonnie Jordan, Charles Miller, Lee Oskar, Howard E. Scott), except where indicated.  (The first track has no credit.)

Side one
"Introductions by E. Rodney Jones of Radio Station WVON, Chicago, Ill." – 0:31
"Sun Oh Son" – 10:39
"The Cisco Kid" – 6:05
"(intro) Slippin' into Darkness" – 0:20

Side two
"Slippin' into Darkness" – 9:45
"Slippin' Part 2" – 8:51

Side three
"All Day Music" (War, Jerry Goldstein) – 10:09
"Ballero" – 8:29
"Lonely Feelin'" – 3:00
"(intro) Get Down" (War, Goldstein) – 0:07

Side four
"Get Down" (War, Goldstein) – 20:30

Credits
Jerry Goldstein in association with Lonnie Jordon and Howard Scott – producers

See also
List of Billboard number-one R&B albums of 1974

References

War (American band) albums
1973 live albums
Rhino Records live albums
United Artists Records live albums
Albums produced by Jerry Goldstein (producer)